Jack Randall Crawford (1878–1968) was an author of novels (many unpublished), plays, and literary criticism and a professor of English at Yale University; he is perhaps best known for his 1922 autobiographical novel I Walked in Arden and his 1928 nonfiction What to Read in English Literature.

Biography
Crawford received his bachelor's degree from Princeton University in 1901. He became an instructor in English at Yale University and also Director of Dramatics at Dartmouth College. He was a professor of English at Yale University from 1909-1946 and then professor emeritus from 1946 until his death in 1968. In addition to his novels, plays, and literary criticism, he wrote an autobiography and edited several of Shakespeare's plays for Yale University Press.

Nonfiction
 with Mary Porter Beegle:

Novels

Plays

References

External links

Yale University faculty
Princeton University alumni
20th-century American novelists
20th-century American dramatists and playwrights
1878 births
1968 deaths
American male novelists
American literary critics
Dartmouth College faculty
American male dramatists and playwrights
20th-century American male writers
Novelists from Connecticut
20th-century American non-fiction writers
American male non-fiction writers